Gynacantha vesiculata is a species of dragonfly in the family Aeshnidae. It is found in Angola, Cameroon, the Republic of the Congo, Ethiopia, Ghana, Guinea, Liberia, Malawi, Mozambique, Nigeria, Sierra Leone, Tanzania, Uganda, and Zambia. Its natural habitats are subtropical or tropical moist lowland forests and shrub-dominated wetlands.

References

Aeshnidae
Insects described in 1891
Taxonomy articles created by Polbot